Reynold Cobham, 1st Baron Cobham of Sterborough, KG (c.1295–1361) was a medieval English knight and diplomat.

Life
He was the son of Sir Reynold Cobham by Joan, the daughter and heir of William de Evere. This Reynold was the second son of John de Cobham, by his first wife Joan the daughter of William Fitzbenedict. The family were based at Sterborough Castle, Lingfield, Surrey.

In his early life he was employed on diplomatic missions. By 1334 he was a knight in the household of King Edward III and fought in the Scottish campaign against David de Bruce and then on the continent in the Low Countries and Brittany. In 1342 he was summoned to the House of Lords as Lord Cobham of Sterborough.

In 1346 he was in the force under Edward III that attacked France, fighting at the Battle of Crécy and the protracted but eventually successful Siege of Calais. In 1352 he was invested as a Knight of the Garter and in 1353 appointed Captain of Calais, a position he held until his death. In 1355 he served under the Edward the Black Prince in Aquitaine, taking part in his march to the Loire and his victory at the Battle of Poitiers, where he was credited by the French historian Jean Froissart with the slaying of the French knight Geoffroi de Charny.

Reynold married Joan Berkeley by whom he could claim to be related to the noble families of Sutton, Dudley, Beauchamp, De Despencer and Mortimer. The Cobham family, however, were well connected to the ruling families of England in their own right.

He died in 1361, probably of the plague, and was laid to rest in an impressive tomb in Lingfield church. He was succeeded by his son Reynold, the second Lord Sterborough.

References

External links
Inquisition Post Mortem #59
Biography and Lingfield tomb

1295 births
1361 deaths
14th-century English Navy personnel
English admirals
People from Surrey
Garter Knights appointed by Edward III
Reynold
People of the Hundred Years' War